A Criação (English: The Creation) is a Portuguese television series produced by Até ao Fim do Mundo. It premiered on 19 September 2017.

It was the first television series to have all episodes released at the same time on RTP Play, a Netflix-style streaming service owned by Rádio e Televisão de Portugal.

Plot 
Each episode unfolds around a project, such as a movie, event, or public relations activity that the client is assigned by an advertising agency. Each episode depicts the production of the idea, including pseudo-rational choices and decisions that reduce it to a travesty. The absurdity is heightened by the fact that the employees are portrayed by actors in animal costumes.

Throughout the series, stories develop relationships between various characters: a romantic relationship between Bear and Chicken, Lion's ambition to climb the ranks, a secret romance between Giraffe and Rat, a classic relationship between Sheep and Shepherd, and Dog's attachment to guarding Sheep. In addition, the series shows the envy among creative professionals, who turn out to be "typical of an office full of stuffed animals."

Cast 
 Alba Baptista as Little Mouse
 Bárbara Lourenço as Woodcock
 Bruna Quintas as Little Robot
 Diogo Mesquita as Bear
 Gonçalo Carvalho as Little Lion
 Mafalda Jara as Giraffe
 Rita Tristão da Silva	as Little Lamb
 Romeu Vala as Raven
 Tomás Alves as Dog
 Angel Tovar as Fox
 Luís Lobão as Shepherd

Episodes 
</onlyinclude>

References 

Portuguese-language television shows
2017 Portuguese television series debuts